Niraj Chag is a London-based musical artist and composer. His musical style mixes Indian classical influences with contemporary stylings and layered, complex beats. Niraj's tracks were initially released on the Outcaste record label and later on his own Buzz-erk label. He has written and produced three albums released under his own name: Along the Dusty Road (2006), The Lost Souls (2009) and Mud Doll (2015).

Biography 
Born in Southampton, England, Niraj's first professional experience in music was working on Mark Hill's label.

Moving to Outcaste Records in London, Niraj released the single "Walk Alone" and contributed four tracks to the album Outcaste New Breed.

Since leaving Outcaste Records, Niraj has worked on the British Asian musical Baiju Bawra, which opened in London's Stratford East Theatre in 2002 and was adapted into a radio play by the BBC Asian Network in 2011 and numerous soundtracks, including, for television, the BAFTA- and Emmy-nominated Power of Art (2007), The Age of Terror (BBC, 2008), Darwin's Dangerous Idea (BBC 2008), City Beneath The Waves: Pavlopetri (2011), Origins of Us (BBC, 2011), Jimmy and The Whale Whisperer (Channel 4, 2012), Rise of the Continents (2013), Our Girl (2013), Sex and the City (HBO, 2003), The Mystery of Romes X-Tomb (2013), Food Prices: The Shocking Truth (Channel 4, 2014), Worlds Busiest Railway (2015), Six Degrees Of Separation (2015), The Secrets Of Your Food (2017) and, for film, All in Good Time (2012).

In May 2006 he released "Bangles", the first song from his album Along the Dusty Road, on the Buzz-erk label. According to notes from his website, "Bangles" was inspired by the journey his grandmother made in migrating to the UK from India via Africa.

Along the Dusty Road was a "pet project" three years in the making, and "Bangles" and "Khwaab" (another song from the album) attracted the attention of new fans less familiar with his earlier work, both songs being playlisted on BBC and local radio stations

The success of the tracks led to Niraj recording a BBC session at their Maida Vale Studios, a live set at the inaugural BBC Electric Proms, and the song "Nomad" was selected to be the iTunes free download of the week in June 2006.

In 2006, Niraj won "Best Asian Underground" at the UK Asian Music Awards. and in 2007 he composed the music for the Olivier award-winning stage play Rafta Rafta (Royal National Theatre).

Chag's follow-up album The Lost Souls was released in early March 2009, featuring the singles "Baavaria" and "Ur Jaa." On 24 October 2009 Chag performed in concert with a live band at LSO St Luke's in London, followed by a concert at the CBSO Centre in Birmingham.

Niraj's third album Mud Doll was released in June 2015 and featured the singles "Rang Diya" and "Sab Qurban".

In April 2010 Niraj launched a new online 'music and life' blog called EasternSoul.net with the intention of 'providing an alternative to the modern trend of throwaway "here today, gone tomorrow" music.' EasternSoul.net features a podcast, interviews and features on contemporary Asian musicians

According to notes from his website Niraj has composed music for over 20 dance productions including Shobana Jeyasinghs Where Is Dev?/Classic Cuts(Royal Opera House, 2012).

In 2012, Niraj composed the music for the West End Musical Wah! Wah! Girls and the Royal Shakespeare Company's production of Much Ado About Nothing. In 2014, Niraj composed the music for The West Yorkshire Playhouse production of The Jungle Book and, in 2015, he composed the music for The Royal National Theatre's production of Dara. In 2017, he created the sound design and score for the RIFCO Arts production of Miss Meena and The Masala Queens. In 2018, he composed the music for The Captive Queen at Shakespeare's Globe Theatre.

Having worked on the BBC Radio 4 adaptations of The Mahabharata and The Ramayana in 2015 Niraj collaborated with radio production company Wise Buddah to create the new station sound for the BBC Asian Network and in 2017 he created the music for one of BBC 1's new 'Oneness' idents featuring a troop of Bhangra dancers.

Discography
 Outcaste New Breed (Outcaste Records, 1998)
 Along the Dusty Road (Buzz-erk Group, 2006)
 Rafta Rafta Soundtrack Album (Buzz-erk Group, 2007)
 The Lost Souls (Buzz-erk Group, 2009)
 Mud Doll (Buzz-erk Group, 2015)

References

External links
Official website
Eastern Soul

Asian Underground musicians
Living people
1976 births
Musicians from London
British people of Indian descent